Ángel González (born 16 May 1994) is an Argentine professional footballer who plays as a right winger for LDU Quito, on loan from Estudiantes.

Career
González joined Godoy Cruz in 2011. He was promoted into the club's first-team in 2014, appearing on the substitutes bench twice during the 2014 Primera División season for matches versus Estudiantes and Olimpo. In April 2015, González made his professional debut during a 2–2 draw with Vélez Sarsfield. Eleven more appearances followed in 2015. He scored his first Godoy Cruz goal on 21 February 2016 in a 4–1 home victory against Colón. On 27 June 2019, Estudiantes announced a deal had been agreed for González; pending contract terms and a medical.

On 14 July 2021, González joined Lanús on a 12-months loan deal with a purchase option. In July 2022, González was sent out on a new loan deal, this time to Ecuadorian club LDU Quito for one year, also with a purchase option.

Career statistics
.

References

External links

1994 births
Living people
Argentine footballers
Argentine expatriate footballers
Sportspeople from Mendoza Province
Association football wingers
Argentine Primera División players
Ecuadorian Serie A players
Godoy Cruz Antonio Tomba footballers
Estudiantes de La Plata footballers
Club Atlético Lanús footballers
L.D.U. Quito footballers
Argentine expatriate sportspeople in Ecuador
Expatriate footballers in Ecuador